Pen-y-graig (Welsh for ) may refer to one of these places in Wales:

Pen-y-graig (electoral ward), electoral ward in Rhondda Cynon Taf
Penygraig, village and community in Rhondda Cynon Taf
Pen-y-graig, Carmarthenshire, area of Llanelli, Carmarthenshire
Pen-y-graig, Gwynedd, village in Gwynedd
Pen-y-graig-goch, SSSI in Carmarthenshire
, SSSI in Ceredigion
Ffridd Pen-y-Graig, hill in Powys
Pen-y-Graig-fawr, hill in Powys
Mynydd Pen-y-graig, hill in Rhondda Cynon Taf

See also
Penygraigwen, village in Anglesey
Pencraig, Anglesey, area in Anglesey